The 1989–90 Idaho Vandals men's basketball team represented the University of Idaho during the 1989–90 NCAA Division I men's basketball season. Members of the Big Sky Conference, the Vandals were led by second-year head coach Kermit Davis and played their home games on campus at the Kibbie Dome in Moscow, Idaho.

At the conference tournament in Boise, the Vandals earned a third consecutive bye into the semifinals, where they beat sixth seed Montana State by nine points. In the final against league runner-up Eastern Washington, Idaho's Ricardo Boyd sank a three-pointer as time expired to break a tie and give the Vandals a second consecutive 

Seeded thirteenth again in the West Regional, Idaho lost to Louisville by nineteen points in Salt Lake City in the  Davis left in late March for Texas A&M, and was succeeded by Larry Eustachy, a former fellow UI assistant in Tim Floyd's first season 

This was Idaho's fourth appearance in the NCAA tournament in ten years, but remains its most recent.

Postseason results

|-
!colspan=6 style=| Big Sky tournament

|-
!colspan=6 style=| NCAA tournament

References

External links
Sports Reference – Idaho Vandals: 1989–90 basketball season
Gem of the Mountains: 1990 University of Idaho yearbook – 1989–90 basketball season
Idaho Argonaut – student newspaper – 1990 editions

Idaho Vandals men's basketball seasons
Idaho
Idaho
Idaho
Idaho